Oldendorff Carriers is a family owned shipping company with headquarters in Lübeck.

Oldendorff Carriers GmbH & Co. KG is the largest German bulk carrier company. It operates around 700 ships, some chartered, with a carrying capacity of approximately 57 million tonnes.

Company 
The Oldendorff fleet makes some 14,000 port calls in 60 countries, carrying about 320 million tons of bulk cargo and bulk goods a year. Growth has been rapid since 2005, when 50 million tons was carried.

Oldendorff Carriers is a wholly owned subsidiary of a family holding company, Egon Oldendorff. The headquarters in Lübeck have been on the top floor of the Radisson Blu Senator Hotel since 1999. Around 4,000 employees work for the company, including 210 at the company headquarters, nicknamed "The Dorff", and more than 100 in 17 branch offices in Copenhagen, Hamburg, London, Stamford, Singapore, Mumbai, Melbourne, Shanghai, Tokyo, Vancouver, Cape Town, Santiago, New Amsterdam, Trinidad, Hong Kong, Iskenderun and Dubai. The fleet employs well over 2,000 sailors.

History 
On 19 February 1921, 21-year-old Egon Oldendorff joined a small shipping company in Hamburg as a partner, where he trained for nine months. The shipping company was renamed Lilienfeld & Oldendorff and taken over by Oldendorff at the end of the year. The company's first ship was an 870-ton steamer, Planet, built in Rostock in 1881. The company moved to Lübeck in 1925. At the outbreak of World War 2, the company owned 13 ships, but only the Gisela Oldendorff and the Nordmark remained after the war.

The fleet grew rapidly in the early 1950s due to the Korean War. The operation of bulk carriers started in 1958 with the Baltic Sea timber trade. In 1964, Klaus E. Oldendorff, one of the sons of the company's founder, left to start the shipping company Reederei Nord in Hamburg. In 1980, 23-year-old Henning Oldendorff took over as CEO from his 80-year-old father, who died on May 9, 1984, leaving Henning as the majority shareholder. In 1995 Henning founded another shipping company, Concept Carriers, which merged in January 2001 with the main company to form Oldendorff Carriers. Increasingly the company has been buying its ships from Chinese yards, which it has described as a good experience.

Transhipment 
Since starting at Iskenderun in 2001, then Musaffah Port's Emirates Steel from 2007, the company has developed schemes to transfer 30 million tons a year of its cargoes out at sea between large ships and barges at eight ports. The company operates 4 transloaders, 4 floating cranes and 2 transhipment platforms.

Fleet 
As at January 2019 the company had 716 ships in service, or under construction, 143 of them owned by the company (OWN) and others as index chartered vessels on floating charter (T/C), or Bareboat charters (B/B). Of those 165 were Capesize, 206 Panamax, 178 Supramax, 111 Handysize and 56 used for transhipment. Total dwt amounted to 60,881,703 and the average age of the fleet was 8 years. The company planned to receive four new ships from Japan's Oshima Shipbuilding in March 2020.

See also 

 MV Elisabeth Oldendorff 1992
Irene Oldendorff 1944
Magdalena Oldendorff 1996

References 

Shipping companies of Germany
Transport companies established in 1921
Dry bulk shipping companies
Privately held companies of Germany